Adoxophyes aurantiana is a species of moth of the family Tortricidae. It is found on the Solomon Islands, Guadalcanal and Papua New Guinea.

This species has a wingspan of 12–16 mm for the females and 17–20 mm for the males.

References

Moths described in 1961
Adoxophyes
Moths of Oceania
Moths of New Guinea